Sigrid Schultz (January 15, 1893 – May 14, 1980) was a notable American reporter and war correspondent in an era when women were a rarity in both print and radio journalism. Working for the Chicago Tribune in the 1920s, she was the first female foreign bureau chief of a major U.S. newspaper.

Early life and education 
Schultz was born in Chicago, Illinois. Her parents were of Norwegian ancestry, and her father was a well-known painter who had studied at the Académie de peinture et de sculpture in Paris, France. When Schultz was eight, her father obtained a commission to paint the king and queen of Württemberg in Germany and the family moved to Europe. After completing the royal commission, Schultz's father continued to receive requests for portrait painting and decided to stay in Europe, establishing a studio in Paris.  Sigrid attended lycée — the French equivalent of American high school education — and subsequently studied international law at the Sorbonne, graduating in 1914. She taught French and English in Berlin for much of World War I.

Some sources claim that while in Germany with her mother, she fell ill with what was believed to be tuberculosis, leading her to be forced to remain in Germany during World War I; however, Schultz herself wrote that she remained in Germany due to her parents' illness, and that around this period she also studied history and international law at Berlin University. (Her obituary in the Chicago Tribune said that she was "a student at Berlin University training to be an opera singer.")

Career
At war's end, Colonel Robert R. McCormick, owner and publisher of the Chicago Tribune, needed a correspondent fluent in both German and English. Among other things, McCormick wanted someone able with the ability to explain in detail the Battle of Jutland, the war's most significant naval battle,  to Tribune readers. Schultz joined the Tribune in 1919 and, with fluency in several languages to her credit, became the chief for Central Europe in 1926. She had been named the chief of the Berlin bureau for the Tribune late in 1925. It is believed that Schultz was the first woman to ever hold such a position for a major news media organization.

Convinced by events that National Socialism would become a significant force in Germany, Schultz sought interviews with leading members of the Nazi movement, establishing at an early date an acquaintance with then-Captain Hermann Göring, who was later to become Nazi Germany's highest-ranking leader behind Adolf Hitler. Though personally repelled by Nazism, Schultz cultivated her connections with Göring and with other leading Nazis, strengthening her access to these authoritative news sources, as the Nazis gained control of Germany and, later, as Europe moved toward war.  Schultz interviewed Adolf Hitler several times and her firsthand knowledge of Germany's leaders helped her to accurately report their intentions and goals, as Nazi Germany's ambitions posed an increasing threat to world peace.

Beginning in 1938, Schultz began to report for the Mutual Broadcasting System along with the Chicago Tribune. In doing so, she became "the first woman to broadcast regularly on an American network from Europe." She was considered by some of her fellow reporters as only a fair writer but a superb investigator and reporter. Fellow Berlin correspondent William L. Shirer wrote that "No other American correspondent in Berlin knew so much of what was going on behind the scenes as did Sigrid Schultz."

Though Nazi German officials were often displeased with Schultz's reporting — which they deemed as critical of the regime — she had not been expelled from Germany as had other reporters deemed "hostile" to the nation's "revival" under Nazism. In order not to jeopardize her ability to work in Germany without imprisonment or expulsion, Schultz during 1938 and 1939 filed some of her dispatches under a pseudonym.  Published in the Tribune's weekly magazine under the fictitious name "John Dickson," Schultz filed her dispatches from outside Germany — usually from Oslo or Copenhagen — with false datelines.  These articles reported on the attacks the German government made on the nation's churches, exposed the concentration camps and the increasing persecution of Germany's Jews.  In one of these dispatches, Dickson asserted that Germany was prepared for war and predicted the Munich Agreement that gave Hitler free rein to march into Czechoslovakia.

On July 13, 1939, one of Dickson's articles received front-page placement in the Tribune. The dispatch forecast the non-aggression pact that took place between Germany and the Soviet Union five weeks later.  Writing as Dickson, Schultz reported that "Supporters of the theory of Nazi-Soviet cooperation claim that plans for a new partition of Poland, dividing it between Germany and Russia, have been concluded."

It was Schultz who awoke CBS reporter William L. Shirer on the morning of the German invasion of Poland, September 1, 1939.  Shirer's Berlin Diary recounts the events of that morning.
Berlin, September 1

At six a.m., Sigrid Schultz — bless her heart — phoned. She said: "It's happened."  I was very sleepy — my body and mind numbed, paralyzed. I mumbled: "Thanks, Sigrid," and tumbled out of bed. The war is on!

Schultz reported on the many military triumphs of the Wehrmacht during the first year of World War II, but was not permitted to travel to the front because she was a woman. She left Germany after being injured in an Allied air raid on Berlin. While in Spain, she developed typhus and returned to the United States in early 1941. What had been expected to be a brief leave developed into a three-year convalescence from the disease.

During this period, Schultz wrote a book about Germany titled Germany Will Try It Again and made a nationwide lecture tour about her quarter-century in Germany.

Schultz returned to Europe as a war correspondent in January, 1945 and accompanied the U.S. Army on the advance of the Allied armies into Germany. Schultz was also one of the first journalists to visit Buchenwald and she reported on the Nuremberg Trial.

After the war, she continued her reporting and wrote several books. Schultz was working on a history of anti-semitism in Germany when she died in 1980. (Her obituary in the Chicago Tribune said that she was "working on a book that was to be a history of the two World Wars and the Holocaust.")

Schultz's writings 

In Schultz's book Germany Will Try It Again, she describes, based on her first-hand witness reports on what is in essence would equate with a German-Austrian Military-Industrial Complex composed of wealthy landowners (Junkers), bankers, and corporate businessmen (of companies still thriving today), who fired World War I, then planned a comeback despite defeat in 1918, propped up Hitler, were planning a comeback in 1944 (ultimately leading to the formation of Die Spinne and ODESSA) as well as the Vatican ratlines to South America and the harboring of Nazi officers in the USA after 1945. This true German corporate/banking elite class (obviously excluding Jews) had planned a Central European Empire (Mitteleuropa) that would subjugate Slavs to the German nation, and would restore the greatness of both the Habsburgs Austrian Empire and the earlier so-called Holy Roman Empire. Schultz often refers to the Nazi's skill at "war-in-peace" which bears striking resemblances to the post-1945 Cold War, and may well have served as its roots.

Schultz also covers the successful appeal of the Nazis to both British and American corporations to ally themselves with Germany in a fight against Communism.  While not so successful in Britain, alliances were successful with American corporate investors such as Prescott Bush.
Nazi agents in the USA promoted the German American Bund, the roots of many current neo-Nazi groups, and sought to provoke divisive American racial tensions through support of other American racist organizations.

Lastly, Schultz covers the Nazi drive to build up business and political alliances in South America, which led to the foundations of the Juan Perón regime in Argentina, the Alfredo Stroessner regime in Paraguay, and the more recent Augusto Pinochet regime in Chile.

Death
On May 15, 1980, Schultz died in her Westport, Connecticut, retirement home. She was 87.

Papers and named scholarship 
Schultz's papers are housed at the Wisconsin Historical Society.

Schultz's estate established a scholarship fund for journalism students. In 2014, Central Connecticut State University (CCSU) began awarding the Sigrid Schultz Scholarship for Future Journalists, given to two undergraduate students each year who major in journalism. The scholarship is administered by TD Bank, N.A., and the CCSU Foundation in partnership with the CCSU Department of Journalism.

See also 
 Nazi Germany
 William L. Shirer
 Martha Dodd
 William E. Dodd
 Bella Fromm
 Mildred Harnack
 In the Garden of Beasts: Love, Terror, and an American Family in Hitler's Berlin

Notes

References

Sources

External links
 Article about women reporters in American Journalism Review
 Excerpt from The Women Who Wrote the War (Harper-Collins)
 Old Time Radio article about Sigrid Schultz
  About Sigrid Schultz - Biography of war correspondent Sigrid Schultz in "Angora: Rabbit Raising in German Concentration Camps," an online image gallery documenting the SS Angora project. Available on Wisconsin Historical Images, the Wisconsin Historical Society's online image database.

1893 births
1980 deaths
American women journalists
Historians of Nazism
American war correspondents
University of Paris alumni
American people of Norwegian descent
Writers from Chicago